Saint Margaret of Antioch is a 1599 oil on canvas painting by Annibale Carracci, showing Margaret of Antioch. It hangs in Santa Caterina dei Funari church in Rome.

History
It was commissioned by Gabriele Bombasi for the chapel he had acquired at Santa Caterina dei Funari in Rome. He was a scholar from Reggio Emilia who had been tutor to Ranuccio and Odoardo Farnese and had moved to Rome in Odoardo's service. It now hangs in Santa Caterina dei Funari church in Rome. Carracci painted several works in Reggio Emilia, none still in their original locations. According to one theory, Carracci's contact with Bombasi was pivotal for his career and may even have been how he first came to the attention of Odoardo Farnese, who summoned him to Rome in 1595 or 1596 and kept him in his service for the rest of his life. By express wish of the commissioner, the painting reproduces (with slight variations) Saint Catherine of Alexandria in the artist's 1592 San Luca Madonna, produced for Reggio Emilia Cathedral and now in the Louvre.

Sources disagree on whether it is a fully autograph work. Giovanni Pietro Bellori's 1672 The Lives of the Artists states the work was copied from the San Luca Madonna by Carracci's pupil as Lucio Massari, with Carracci himself retouching the dragon and the landscape. Giulio Mancini's 1620 Considerazioni sulla pittura instead argued it was a fully autograph work, produced in Bologna before being moved to the Palazzo Farnese and then to Rome, where it was placed in the Bombasi Chapel.

Gallery

References

Paintings by Annibale Carracci
Paintings in Rome
Carracci
1599 paintings
Oil on canvas paintings